The European Consumer Organisation (BEUC, from the French name Bureau Européen des Unions de Consommateurs, "European Bureau of Consumers' Unions") is an umbrella consumers' group, founded in 1962. Based in Brussels, Belgium, it brings together 45 European consumer organisations from 32 countries (EU, EEA and applicant countries).

BEUC represents its members and defends the interests of consumers in the decision process of the Institutions of the European Union, acting as the "consumer voice in Europe". BEUC does not deal with consumers’ complaints as it is the role of its national member organisations.

The organisation is funded by an EU grant, its member fees and other specific projects (see "External links"). In 2010, the operational budget of BEUC amounted to €2.9m. In 2012, it reached €3,160,000. In 2012, the EU funding represented 43% of the operational BEUC budget.

BEUC has subscribed to the European Union’s Transparency Register.

History 

BEUC was created on 6 March 1962 by consumer organisations of Belgium, Luxembourg, France, the Netherlands, Italy and Germany. After working together for a number of years, these organisations decided to create a European association, based in Brussels.

BEUC was one of the first lobbying organisations to set up base in the European capital in a bid to influence the decision-making process. Many others followed, and the number of lobbyists rose exponentially to the present-day figure of over 15,000.

Activities 

The organisation’s work is divided into 8 priority areas: consumer rights and enforcement, digital rights, energy, financial services, food, health, safety & sustainability. Its priorities are defined by BEUC members who meet twice a year at the general assembly and at several experts’ meetings.

Additionally, BEUC has been watching closely the Transatlantic Trade and Investment Partnership (TTIP) negotiations since their start in June 2013, safeguarding consumer interests in Europe. 'The consumer view on TTIP' is a blog signed by BEUC's Director General, Monique Goyens and examines the possible effects that a trade deal between the EU and US might have on consumers.

In 2012, BEUC celebrated its 50th anniversary. Some of the organisation's achievements in consumer-related areas include cross-border bank payments, GMO labelling and personal data protection.

At the international level, BEUC is a member of Consumers International, the global federation of consumer groups. It is also active in the Transatlantic Consumer Dialogue (TACD), a forum of US and EU consumer organisations.
BEUC is also active in empowering the consumer movement in Central, Eastern and South-Eastern Europe (CESEE countries) carrying out several initiatives.

Members

See also 
 European Food Safety Authority (EFSA)
 International Consumer Research & Testing (ICRT)
 List of consumer organizations
 Super-complaint
 Consumer protection

References

External links 
 
 Cojef
 Confinad
 Trace

Consumer rights organizations
Business organizations based in Europe
Organizations established in 1962